The Taipei Economic and Cultural Office, Ho Chi Minh City (Vietnamese: Văn phòng Kinh tế Văn hóa Đài Bắc tại thành phố Hồ Chí Minh) represents the interests of Taiwan in the southern regions of Vietnam and Cambodia, functioning as a de facto consulate in the absence of diplomatic relations. There is also a Taipei Economic and Cultural Office in Vietnam located in Hanoi, which has responsibility for relations with the northern regions of Vietnam as well as Laos.

Its counterpart body in Taiwan is the Vietnam Economic and Culture Office in Taipei.

History
The Ho Chi Minh City office, along with its counterpart in Hanoi, was established in June 1992. Until 1975, Taiwan, as the Republic of China, had an embassy in Saigon. From 1964 to 1972, General Hu Lien served as the ambassador. However, the embassy suspended operations after the defeat of South Vietnam by the Communist North, which has diplomatic relations with the People's Republic of China.

See also
Taiwan–Vietnam relations
List of diplomatic missions of Taiwan
List of diplomatic missions in Vietnam
Taipei Economic and Cultural Representative Office

References

Vietnam
Taiwan
Taiwan–Vietnam relations
1992 establishments in Vietnam
Organizations established in 1992